The River Leven (pronounced ) in North Yorkshire, England is a tributary of the River Tees. It rises on Warren Moor, part of Kildale Moor, in the North York Moors and flows to the north of the moors to join the River Tees at Yarm.

Course

The source of the river is on Warren Moor, part of Kildale Moor, just south of the village of Kildale. The river flows east until it reaches the Whitby to Middlesbrough railway line where it turns around to flow west to Kildale. It then flows south-south-west through woodland to its confluence with Dundale Beck where it turns north-west through Low Easby and Little Ayton, before turning west and then south-west at Great Ayton. It runs parallel to the A173 to Stokesley. The river becomes increasingly meandering as it continues south-west past Skutterskelfe to Hutton Rudby and Rudby, where it turns north-west and then west again over Slape Stones waterfall. At Crathorne it turns north and then north-east as far as Middleton-on-Leven before passing under the A19 in a north-west direction. The final couple of miles are north and north-west between Ingleby Barwick and Yarm, before the river joins the River Tees.

Water levels

 Low and High Water Levels are an average figure.

In October 2022, a new flood defence project was opened on the river above Stokesley. When river levels are high, a new flood channel diverts the excess water around the town, meeting the Leven again, further downstream. The Environment Agency funded the project at a cost of £3.7 million.

Geology

The river drains from the Cleveland Hills across a mixed geology of mostly Permian and Jurassic age bedrock of low permeability. Most of the deposits on top of the bedrock are boulder clay. There is mixed agriculture, with some moorland and forestry near the source.

Natural history

Since a weir on the lower river was built during the Industrial Revolution, migratory and territorial fish and mammals had been missing from the river. In 2007, the Environment Agency built a fish bypass at the weir. In 2011, they announced the return of spawning salmon for the first time in 150 years.

In 2020, it was confirmed that crayfish plague had infected the river after 40 dead white-clawed crayfish were found along a  stretch of river.

History

In Stokesley, the river is crossed by Taylorson's Bridge, a 17th-century packhorse bridge, which was once the only crossing in the town. The Domesday Book records  a water mill on the banks of the river in the town. In Hutton Rudby, a plaque on a bridge marks the spot of a water mill that, amongst several uses, once made sailcloth.

Lists

Tributaries

 Lonsdale Beck
 Dundale Beck
 Otter Hills Beck
 Main Stell
 Ings Beck
 Eller Beck
 West Beck
 River Tame
 Grange Beck
 Alum Beck
 Carr Stell
 Coul Beck
 Hundale Gill
 Magpie Gill
 Fanny Bell's Gill
 East Gill

Settlements

 Kildale
 Low Easby
 Little Ayton
 Great Ayton
 Stokesley
 Skutterskelfe
 Rudby
 Hutton Rudby
 Crathorne
 Middleton-on-Leven
 Low Leven
 High Leven
 Ingleby Barwick
Levendale (Yarm)

Crossings

 Petlar's Bridge, near Kildale
 Unnamed road, near Kildale
 Whitby to Middlesbrough Railway Line
 Unnamed road north of Kildale
 Whitby to Middlesbrough Railway Line
 Unnamed road north of Easby
 Cross Lane, Little Ayton
 Holmes bridge, Little Ayton (foot)
 Holly Garth, Great Ayton
 A173, Levenside, Great Ayton
 A172, Stokesley
 B1257, Stokesley Bridge
 Manor Close/Levenside, Stokesley (ford)
 Malvern Drive, Stokesley
 B1365, Bense Bridge, Stokesley
 Hutton Bridge, Hutton Rudby
 Crathorne Mill Bridge, Crathorne
 Foxton bridge near Middleton-on-Leven
 A19 near Middleton-on-Leven
 A1044, Leven Bridge, Low Leven

Gallery

Sources

 Ordnance Survey Open Viewer https://www.ordnancesurvey.co.uk/business-government/tools-support/open-data-support
 Google Earth
 National Environment Research Council - Centre for Ecology and Hydrology 
 Environment Agency

References

Rivers of North Yorkshire